Sir Roger Fray Greenwood Ormrod, PC (20 October 1911 – 6 January 1992) was a British Lord Justice of Appeal.

Biography 
Ormrod was educated at Shrewsbury School and the Queen's College, Oxford. Although he had studied law at university, his father insisted that he train as a doctor.

After serving in the Royal Army Medical Corps during the Second World War, he returned to legal practice, specializing in divorce cases and becoming Queen's Counsel in 1958. In 1961 he was appointed a judge of the Probate, Divorce and Admiralty Division, and in 1974 a Lord Justice of Appeal. He was a significant figure in the development of the jurisprudence of no-fault divorce in the English courts.

His best known finding came in the divorce case of Corbett v Corbett (1971), in which the wife was a male-to-female transsexual. Ormrod held that, for the purpose of marriage, sex was to be legally defined by three factors that he called 'biological' – namely chromosomal, gonadal and genital. Any 'operative intervention' was to be ignored, as were any 'psychological factors' (in that case identified with 'transsexualism'). He said:

On the basis of the medical evidence, Ormrod held that the wife was not a woman for the purposes of marriage but a biological male, and had been so since birth. Accordingly, as the relationship called marriage "is and always has been recognised as the union of man and woman", the marriage was void ab initio.

Ormrod was for many years the chairman of the very successful Notting Hill Housing Trust a charitable housing association then operating mostly in RBK&C and the LB Hammersmith and Fulham.

Sources
Obituary in The Times, 9 January 1992.

References

Lords Justices of Appeal
Members of the Privy Council of the United Kingdom
1911 births
1992 deaths
Alumni of The Queen's College, Oxford
Royal Army Medical Corps officers
British Army personnel of World War II
Knights Bachelor
Probate, Divorce and Admiralty Division judges
20th-century British medical doctors